This is a list of the seaports in Northern Ireland
 Ardglass
 Ballycastle, County Antrim
 Bangor, County Down
 Belfast Harbour
 Carrickfergus
 Coleraine
 Kilkeel
 Larne
 Londonderry Port
 Portaferry
 Portavogie
 Portstewart
 Strangford
 Warrenpoint

See also
 List of ports and harbours in Scotland
 List of ports in England and Wales
 List of ports in Ireland

References

 
Ports
 
Northern Ireland